The men's welterweight event was part of the boxing programme at the 1972 Summer Olympics. The weight class allowed boxers of up to 67 kilograms to compete. The competition was held from 28 August to 10 September 1972. 37 boxers from 37 nations competed.

Medalists

Results
The following boxers took part in the event:

First round
 Ib Bøtcher (DEN) def. Nicolas Ortiz Flores (PUR), 3:2
 Vladimir Kolev (BUL) def. Abdelhamid Fouad Gad (EGY), 5:0
 David Jackson (UGA) def. Victor Zilberman (ROU), 3:2
 Carlos Burga (PER) def. Ketil Hodne (NOR), 4:1
 Jesse Valdez (USA) def. Kolman Kalipe (TOG), 5:0

Second round
 Alfonso Fernández (ESP) def. Hakki Sözen (TUR), 4:1
 Maurice Hope (GBR) def. Garry Davis (BAH), 5:0
 Damdinjavyn Bandi (MGL) def. Emma Flash Ankoudey (GHA), 3:2
 János Kajdi (HUN) def. James Vrij (HOL), 4:1
 Kerry Devlin (AUS) def. Mirgaani Rizgalla (SUD), TKO-3
 Sergio Lozano (MEX) def. Joe Mensah (NGR), 5:0
 Vartex Parsanian (IRI) def. Mbaraka Mkanga (TNZ), 5:0
 Richard Murunga (KEN) def. Alfons Stawski (POL), 4:1
 Emilio Correa (CUB) def. Damiano Lassandro (ITA), 5:0
 Manfred Wolke (GDR) def. Panayotis Therianos (GRE), 4:1
 Günther Meier (FRG) def. Jeff Rackley (NZL), 5:0
 Sangnual Rabieb (THA) def. Karl Gschwind (SUI), 5:0
 Anatoliy Khokhlov (URS) def. Julio Medina (CHI), TKO-3
 John Rodgers (IRL) def. Ib Bøtcher (DEN), TKO-3
 David Jackson (UGA) def. Vladimir Kolev (BUL), 4:1
 Jesse Valdez (USA) def. Carlos Burga (PER), 4:1

Third round
 Maurice Hope (GBR) def. Alfonso Fernández (ESP), walk-over
 János Kajdi (HUN) def. Damdinjavyn Bandi (MGL), KO-2
 Sergio Lozano (MEX) def. Kerry Devlin (AUS), 4:1
 Richard Murunga (KEN) def. Vartex Parsanian (IRI), TKO-3
 Emilio Correa (CUB) def. Manfred Wolke (GDR), TKO-2
 Günther Meier (FRG) def. Sangnual Rabieb (THA), 5:0
 Anatoliy Khokhlov (URS) def. John Rodgers (IRL), 5:0
 Jesse Valdez (USA) def. David Jackson (UGA), 4:1

Quarterfinals
 János Kajdi (HUN) def. Maurice Hope (GBR), 5:0
 Richard Murunga (KEN) def. Sergio Lozano (MEX), KO-1
 Emilio Correa (CUB) def. Günther Meier (FRG), 3:2
 Jesse Valdez (USA) def. Anatoly Khohlov (URS), 5:0

Semifinals
 János Kajdi (HUN) def. Richard Murunga (KEN), 4:1
 Emilio Correa (CUB) def. Jesse Valdez (USA), 3:2

Final
 Emilio Correa (CUB) def. János Kajdi (HUN), 5:0

References

Welterweight